Highworth Warneford School is a mixed academy status secondary school in the small town of Highworth, north of Swindon, Wiltshire, England for pupils aged 11 to 16. Since July 2011, the school has been an academy.

History 
The modern Highworth Warneford was established in 1975, replacing Warneford Secondary Modern School which was established in 1957. The main buildings from the original school are still in use. There have been constant expansions of the school ever since, including the addition of a sports hall.

In 2011, the school was awarded specialist status as a Technology College.

Ofsted judgements

In 2001 Ofsted judged the school to have serious weaknesses. In 2003 the school was judged to have improved.

At its March 2018 Ofsted inspection the school was assessed as "Requires Improvement", a deterioration from the 2013 rating of "Good".

References

Secondary schools in Swindon
Educational institutions established in 1975
1975 establishments in England
Academies in Swindon
Highworth